Khokhlovo is a rural locality (a village) in Gorodishchenskoye Rural Settlement, Nyuksensky District, Vologda Oblast, Russia. The population was 21 as of 2002.

Geography 
Khokhlovo is located 59 km southwest of Nyuksenitsa (the district's administrative centre) by road. Pustynya is the nearest rural locality.

References 

Rural localities in Nyuksensky District